Presidency of the United Cities and Local Governments is a UCLG political organ, responsible for day-to-day representative function.

It consists of a President, six Co-Presidents, Treasurer and Deputy-Treasurer, as well as Special Envoys, elected at UCLG World Summit by UCLG World Council for the period of three years, reporting to semi-annual Executive Bureau and annual World Council meetings.

It is complemented by Vice-Presidency, elected by UCLG Sections.

2021–2024 Presidency 
The presidency for the 2021–2024 period is:

President: Ilsur Metshin, Mayor of Kazan, Chairman of UNACLA.

Co-Presidents:

 Uğur İbrahim Altay, Mayor of the Metropolitan Municipality of Konya (Turkey)
 Johnny Araya Monge, Mayor of San José (Costa Rica)
 Anne Hidalgo, Mayor of Paris (France)
 Li Mingyuan, Mayor of Xi'an (China)
 Jan van Zanen, Mayor of The Hague (Netherlands)

Treasurers: 
 Berry Vrbanovic, Mayor of Kitchener (Canada) and 
 Madelaine Y. Alfelor-Gazman, Mayor of Iriga (Philippines)

Special Envoy to the United Nations: Ada Colau, Mayor of Barcelona (Spain)

Special Envoy of the Presidency to the New Urban Agenda: Carlos Martínez Mínguez, Mayor of Soria (Spain)

2019–2022 Presidency 
The presidency for the 2019–2022 period is:

President: Mohamed Boudra, Mayor of Al Hoceima, President of the Moroccan Association of mayors.

Co-Presidents:

 Uğur İbrahim Altay, Mayor of the Metropolitan Municipality of Konya (Turkey)
 Li Mingyuan, Mayor of Xi'an (China)
 Johnny Araya Monge, Mayor of San José (Costa Rica)
 Thembi Nkadimeng, Mayor of Polokwane Local Municipality (South Africa)
 Berry Vrbanovic, Mayor of Kitchener (Canada) and 
 Jan van Zanen, Mayor of Utrecht (Netherlands)

Treasurer: Madelaine Y. Alfelor-Gazman, Mayor of Iriga (Philippines)

Special Envoy: Ada Colau, Mayor of Barcelona (Spain) & Fernando Medina, Mayor of Lisbon (Portugal)

2016–2019 Presidency 
The presidency for the 2016–2019 period is:

President: Parks Tau, President of the South African Local Government Association (SALGA).

Co-Presidents:

 Uğur İbrahim Altay, Mayor of the Metropolitan Municipality of Konya (Turkey)
 Ada Colau, Mayor of Barcelona (Spain)
 Wen Guohui, Mayor of Guangzhou (China)
 Anne Hidalgo, Mayor of Paris (France)
 Roland Ries, Mayor of Strasbourg (France)
 Mauricio Rodas Espinel, Mayor of Quito (Ecuador)

Treasurer: Berry Vrbanovic, Mayor of Kitchener (Canada)

Deputy Treasurer: Mohamed Sadiki, Mayor of Rabat (Morocco)

Vice-Presidents:

 Iván Arciénega, Mayor of Sucre (Bolivia)
 Mónica Fein, Mayor of Rosario (Argentina)
 Miguel Lifschitz, Governor of Santa Fe Province (Argentina)
 Carlos Martínez Mínguez, Mayor of Soria (Spain)
 Michael Müller, Mayor of Berlin (Germany)
 Aysen Nikolayev, ex-Mayor of Yakutsk, Head of the Sakha Republic (Russian Federation)
 Rose Christiane Raponda, Mayor of Libreville (Gabon)
 Tri Rismaharini, Mayor of Surabaya (Indonesia)
 Clark Somerville, Regional Councillor of Halton Hills (Canada)
 Fatma Şahin, Mayor of Gaziantep (Turkey)

References 

United Cities and Local Governments